Ranganath is one of the Indian names, based on the faith on Hindu deity Lord Ranganatha, and may refer to:

 Ranganath, Telugu film actor
 Ranganath Misra, Chief Justice, Supreme Court of India (1990–1991)
 Ranganath Vinay Kumar, Indian cricket player
 Suman Ranganath, Telugu film actress
 Ranga Nath Poudyal, Mukhtiyar of Nepal

Indian masculine given names